Stenurella bifasciata is a species of beetle in the family Cerambycidae.

Etymology
The Latin species name bifasciata means "with a double fascia".

Subspecies
Stenurella bifasciata intermedia  Holzschuh, 2006
Stenurella bifasciata lanceolata  (Mulsant & Rey, 1863) 
Stenurella bifasciata limbiventris  (Reitter, 1898) 
Stenurella bifasciata nigrosuturalis  (Reitter, 1895) 
Stenurella bifasciata safronovi  Danilevsky, 2011

Distribution
This species is present in most of Europe, in the eastern Palearctic realm, and in the Near East (Albania, Austria, Belarus, Belgium, Bosnia and Herzegovina, Bulgaria, China, Corsica, Croatia, Czech Republic, Estonia, France, Georgia, Germany, Greece, Hungary, Iran, Italy, Kazakhstan, Latvia, Lebanon, Lithuania, Luxembourg, Macedonia, Moldova, Montenegro, Poland, Portugal, Romania, Russia, Sardinia, Serbia, Sicily, Slovakia, Slovenia, Spain, Switzerland, Syria, Turkey, and Ukraine).

Habitat
These longhorn beetles live in meadows and slopes in foothills and valleys.

Description
Head, antennae, pronotum and legs are black. Pronotum is slightly punctured. Elytra are yellow brown in the males, while in the females they are red, with a widely darkened elytron's suture, black apices and a black heart-shaped or rhomboid marking, sometimes missing in the males. The last three abdominal segments are usually red. The eleventh (last) antennal segment is longer than the tenth.

Biology
Life cycle last 2 years. Larvae develop in dead wood of deciduous trees. They mainly feed on Pedunculate Oak (Quercus robur), Fig (Ficus carica), White Willow (Salix alba), Dog-rose (Rosa canina) and Spanish Broom (Spartium junceum). Adults can be seen from May to September.

Gallery

References

External links
 Beetles anc Coleopterologists

Lepturinae
Beetles of Asia
Beetles of Europe
Beetles described in 1776
Taxa named by Otto Friedrich Müller